Putumayo is a department of Southern Colombia.  It is in the south-west of the country, bordering Ecuador and Peru.  Its capital is Mocoa.

The word putumayo comes from the Quechua languages.  The verb p'utuy means "to spring forth" or "to burst out", and mayu means river.  Thus it means "gushing river".

History

Originally, the southwestern area of the department belonged to the Cofán Indians, the northwestern to the Kamentxá Indians, the central and southern areas to tribes that spoke Tukano languages (such as the Siona), and the eastern to tribes that spoke Witoto languages. Part of the Kamentxá territory was conquered by the Inca Huayna Cápac in 1492, who, after crossing the Cofán territory, established a Quechua population on the valley of Sibundoy, known today as Ingas. After the Inca defeat in 1533, the region was invaded by the Spanish in 1542, and from 1547 was administered by Catholic missions.

The current territory of Putumayo was linked to Popayan during the Spanish Colonial Period and in the first Republican decades belonged to the "Azuay Department", which included territories in Ecuador and Perú. Later a long process of territorial redistributions began:

 1831: Popayán Province.
 1857: Estado Federal del Cauca.
 1886: Cauca Department.
 1905: .
 1909: .
 1912: Comisaría Especial del Putumayo.
 1953: Department of Nariño.
 1957: Comisaría Especial del Putumayo.
 1968: Intendencia Especial del Putumayo.
 1991: Putumayo Department.

Municipalities

See also
Santuario Orito Indí-Andé Fauna and Flora Sanctuary

References

External links
 Government of Putumayo official website
Territorial-Environmental Information System of Colombian Amazon SIAT-AC website

 
Departments of Colombia
States and territories established in 1991
1991 establishments in Colombia